Xhoni Athanas (November 4, 1925 - October 1, 2019), also known as Gjoni Athanas or John Athanas,  was a famous Albanian operatic tenor.  He received numerous awards in his long career as an opera singer, awards and recognitions include "Artist i Merituar" or Merited Artist, "Medalja e Mirnjohjes" or the Medal of Gratitude,  "Mjeshter i Madh" or Great Master, all of the above awarded by the Albanian Presidents and "Lifetime achievement award" awarded by the Albanian-American organization AANO in Boston, MA.

He is remembered for his extraordinary interpretation of the role of Scanderbeg in the Opera "Skenderbeu" of the Albanian composer Prenk Jakova.

Early life

Xhoni was born on November 4, 1925, in Brockton, Massachusetts.  His parents, Olympia and Thanas, both of Albanian origin, lived in America as immigrants for almost 20 years and returned to Albania in 1927 in the region of Korca, when Xhoni was only 2 years old.  From 1927 to 1994 Xhoni lived in Albania. In 1994 he returned to America where he lived until the end of his life.

From an early age, he started to sing Byzantine psalms in the Christian Orthodox Church of Grapsh, a small village in the region of Korca, Albania,  where his father served as a minister, as well as Korca's folk songs, which served as a foundation for his vocal education and increased his passion for singing and the art of music. His father, a minister when Xhoni was living in Albania, had a musical education, he sang himself every night in the church where he practiced and also played the clarinet when he lived in America. He noticed that his son's voice was a gift and encouraged him to follow his talent.

In 1940 Xhoni moves to the city of Korca to pursue his dream of becoming a singer. During the time in Korca he earns valuable experience while participating as a soloist with the Motropolia Chorus and the Group "Lira". He is recognized, at the time, as a tenor with a beautiful and powerful voice. He moves to Tirana in 1947, where he gets involved with the Albanian Military Chorus, under the care of director Gaqo Avrazi,. The Chorus toured in Albania and in many Eastern European countries. During these tours, Athanas earns significant recognition, while interpreting as a soloist and along with Avni Mula, Ibrahim Tukici, Mentor Xhemali, Luk Kacaj, Ndrek Gjergji, Maliq Herri etc.

Education and career

In 1952, he was selected as one of the best talents in Albania and earned a scholarship to study at the Tchaikovsky Conservatory in Moscow as an Operatic Tenor. He studied with Professor Alexander Baturin. At the end of his studies in 1957 he was awarded the second prize in the International Contest of new operatic voices in Moscow, with 110 participants from all over the world. He received the Honorary Degree signed by well known tenor Tito Schipa then director of the Jury..

After finishing his studies, he returns to Tirana, Albania, and starts his career at the Theater of Opera. Teatri i Operas dhe Baletit. During his career there he is distinguished in the roles of Turidu from “Cavalleria Rusticana” of Mascagni, Canio from “Pagliacci” of Leoncavallo, Lenskey from “Eugene Onegin” of Tchaikovsky, Schaunard from "La Boheme" of Puccini, Don Basilio from “The Marriage of Figaro” of Mozart, Dhimitri from “Lulja e kujtimit” of K.Konos, “Bash Murgjini” from “Borana” of A.Mula, “Kuestori” from “Heroina” of V. Nova, Doda from “Mrika” of P. Jakova etc...Apart from interpreting as a soloist at the Theater of Opera in Tirana, he also participates in hundreds of activities, concerts and tours around the world. He tours in Rumania, Soviet Union, China, Mongolia, Korea, Vietnam, Bulgaria, Ukraine, Lithuania, Yugoslavia, Hungary etc. The stage loved him and he loved the stage, everywhere he performed he brought his voice and artistic talent to the wider audience with excellence and an extraordinary ability to communicate with people which often earned him standing ovations. Among others, the Moscow newspaper "Culture" in 1959 writes: “Every theater in the world would be honored to have a tenor like John Athanas". Brymorov, well known professor of the Bulgarian Conservatory has praised the voice of Athanas as “a rare voice that deserves worldly respect”. Toti dal Monte, Italian famous soprano, after listening to him in one of the studios in Moscow said: “Athanas is a rare voice of a dramatic tenor ".

In 1960 he marries Sekine Sharofi Athanas, a classical ballerina.. He has two daughters, Mirela and Edlira, niece Juia and nephew Easton J.

From his personal diary, written between 1957 and 1993, there is a count of  1100 concerts and 450 operatic performances. But the role that raised him in the pedestal of his artistic performance was the role of Scanderbeg, in the Albanian Opera 'Skenderbeu" of Prenk Jakova. Scanderbeg is Albania's greatest hero. Jakova, the composer, loved Athanas' voice and wrote the Opera particularly for his dramatic voice. Scanderbeg, the legendary Albanian hero, staged in 1967 by the Theater of Opera of Tirana, gave Athanas the role of his life, the one role he dedicated so much time preparing for, since it was not only important to interpret it vocally but more importantly the image and strength of the legendary Hero needed to be portrayed truthfully. He studied many books and stories written about Scanderbeg. In the days preparing for the role of Scanderbeg, he found himself not only preparing as a vocalist, but as an actor who prepares for a difficult role, and in a very short time, he not only studied the notes but every single move, in accordance to what he had read about the hero and achieved the success of his life. When he entered the stage, his tall and energetic figure, his acting and his powerful voice were a completion of this legendary role, so much so that it looked as if the real Scanderbeg entered the stage. Pictures of him interpreting the role have been used to illustrate Scanderbeg in history lessons.

Later career

He was a professor of belcanto at the Academy of Arts in Tirana for about 20 years. He also directed the staging of scenes from the operas Norma, Rigoletto, Tosca, Madame Butterfly and Carmen in the 1990s. Also, he worked on a few singing techniques books like "Singing, a way of expression and communication" and "The breathing techniques for the singer", he also worked on a book with a collection of the most beautiful and rare Albanian folk songs, he remembers this collection, where he had to visit many forgotten little villages of Albania and found songs of treasures, as one of the best experiences of his life.

Later life

Another chapter of his life opened when he returned to America, the country where he was born, in 1994. He returned in the Boston area and has the chance to visit  the house where he was born and lived for the first 2 years of his life, in Brockton, a very emotional visit for him, since he had never thought that it would happen in his lifetime, due to constrictions put in place from the regime of the Albanian government during the period of 1944–1990. He was awarded the Medallion of Gratitude from the President of Albania in 2006, awarded for his long singing career and for the interpretation of the role of Scanderbeg, also, in recognition of his involvement with the Albanian community of Boston, where he performed continuously in gatherings and events. He also performed numerous times for the Russian and the Italian community of Boston.  His last stage appearance was in September 2012 at the age of 87 years old, in celebration of Albanian's 100 years of independence concert in Boston, for the Albanian community, when for the last time he performed the aria of Scanderbeg "Lirine s'ua solla une", from the opera Scanderbeg of composer Prenk Jakova, accompanied in piano by his daughter Mirela Athanas. He is a "Merited Artist"(Artist i Merituar)  and a "Great Master" (Mjeshter i Madh) both titles rewarded for his interpretations in Tirana, Albania.   in 2015 he was awarded the "Lifetime achievement award" from the organization of AANO in Boston, MA.

He died peacefully on October 1, 2019, aged 93, one month before his 94th birthday, after a two-year period of ailing health, surrounded by his loving family and the love of his wife, daughter, niece and nephew.  At the day of his burial, his recording of Beethoven's "In questa tomba oscura", with his powerful voice and emotional singing, accompanied him to his final resting place.  He rests in Winchester, Massachusetts,

References 

1925 births
2019 deaths
Albanian male opera singers
American people of Albanian descent
People from Brockton, Massachusetts